Bombardino is a drink popular in Italy during the winter, especially in the ski resorts.  It is made by mixing 1/2 Advocaat or eggnog and 1/2 Brandy.

More commonly, bombardino is obtained mixing 3/4 of hot traditional Italian egg liquor (for example Vov or Zabov) and 1/4 rum or brandy.

"Vov" egg liqueur was created in Padua, Italy, in 1845 by a pastry chef, Gian Battista Pezziol, aiming to use egg yolks (left-over from making of nougats) and mixing them with marsala wine and alcohol.

Bombardino is served hot and with whipping cream on top on request. It has several variations: with coffee (calimero), with rum (pirata) or whisky (scozzese).  The calimero variation is one part Brandy, one part Vov, and one part espresso.

The Bombardino's name is supposedly derived from one of its first imbibers noting its hot temperature and high alcohol and remarking (in Italian) "It's like a little bomb!".

See also
 List of egg drinks

References

Italian drinks
Cocktails with brandy
Cocktails with eggs
Coffee in Italy